SNJ is a Brazilian rap group formed in São Paulo, Brazil. Formed in 1996, the group returned after a break with a new lineup. Sombra, Chris, Rebeld, Minari, Head and DJ Gilmar de Andrade. The SNJ has six disk and a DVD released.

References 

Brazilian hip hop groups